The Olcades were an ancient stock-raising pre-Roman people from Hispania, who lived to the west of the Turboletae in the southeastern fringe of the Iberian system mountains.

Origins 
Related to both the Celtiberians and Carpetani, the Olcades appear to have been a mix of indigenous Iberians under the rule of an aristocracy of Gallic origin. It is believed that the latter sprang from the Volcae Tectosages of southern Gaul, who arrived in Iberia in the wake of the Celtic migrations of the 4th Century BC.

Location 

From the 4th century BC, they occupied most of the modern province of Cuenca, along with the southern tip of Guadalajara and the western fringe of Valencia, where their capital Cartala (Los Villares, near Caudete de las Fuentes; Iberian-type mint: Kelin) – also designated Althea or Althia, and Altaia by some Greek authors – was sited. Other Olcades’ towns were Caesada (Hita de Guadalajara; Iberian-type mint: Kaiseza?) and Laxta (Iniesta?).

Culture 
Archeological evidence recovered from local cemeteries, such as Buenache and Olmedilla de Alarcón, indicates that the Olcades' culture was strongly influenced by contacts with southern Iberian, Phoenician, Etruscan and Greek traders; indeed, they are considered to have been responsible for the cultural ‘Iberianization’ of neighbouring Celtiberia and Carpetania during the 2nd Iron Age.

History 

In 221 BC, under the leadership of their King Tagus (also known as Tago or Tagum), the Olcades entered into a defensive alliance with the Vaccaei and Carpetani to resist Carthaginian expansion into the Meseta, only to be defeated by Hannibal Barca at the battle on the Tagus in 220 BC. Submitted to Punic rule by Hannibal just prior to the 2nd Punic War, the Olcades were thence forced to contribute mercenary troops to his army, for the Greek historian Polybius lists them among the Iberian troops sent by him as reinforcements to Africa in 218 BC. After Hannibal’s departure to Italy, however, they switched sides and fought as Roman allies for the remainder of the conflict. Despite being included in the province of Hispania Citerior in 156–154 BC by the Romans, the Olcades nonetheless seemed to have remained loyal allies of Rome, subsequently successfully fighting off the attacks of the Lusitani under Viriathus in the mid-2nd Century BC.

Romanization 

They kept themselves independent until the late 2nd or early 1st centuries BC when, for unclear reasons, they were dispossessed of their tribal lands by Rome. Not only did the Praetor of Hispania Citerior Gaius Valerius Flaccus founded the military colony of Valeria (Las Valeras – Cuenca) in 92 BC on Olcadian territory after obtaining a great victory over the Celtiberians in the previous year, but he also divided it among Rome's own Edetani and Celtiberian allies, forcing the Olcades to merge with the latter.

See also 
Carpetani
Celtiberian script
Edetani
Vaccaei
Volcae Tectosages
Northeastern Iberian script 
Pre-Roman peoples of the Iberian Peninsula

Notes

References

Francisco Burillo Mozota, Los Celtíberos, etnias y estados, Crítica, Grijalbo Mondadori, S.A., Barcelona (1998, revised edition 2007) 

Lorrio Alvarado, Alberto José, Los Celtíberos, Universidad Complutense de Madrid, Murcia (1997) 
Ángel Montenegro et alii, Historia de España 2 - colonizaciones y formación de los pueblos prerromanos (1200-218 a.C), Editorial Gredos, Madrid (1989) 
Harry Morrison Hine, Hannibal's Battle on the Tagus (Polybius 3.14 and Livy 21.5), Latomus: revue d'études latines, Société d'Études Latines de Bruxelles 38 (4), Bruxelles (1979)

Further reading

Aedeen Cremin, The Celts in Europe, Sydney, Australia: Sydney Series in Celtic Studies 2, Centre for Celtic Studies, University of Sydney (1992) .
Dáithí Ó hÓgáin, The Celts: A History, The Collins Press, Cork (2002) 
Daniel Varga, The Roman Wars in Spain: The Military Confrontation with Guerrilla Warfare, Pen & Sword Military, Barnsley (2015) 
Ludwig Heinrich Dyck, The Roman Barbarian Wars: The Era of Roman Conquest, Author Solutions (2011) ISBNs 1426981821, 9781426981821
John T. Koch (ed.), Celtic Culture: A Historical Encyclopedia, ABC-CLIO Inc., Santa Barbara, California (2006) , 1-85109-445-8

External links
http://www.celtiberia.net

Pre-Roman peoples of the Iberian Peninsula
Celtic tribes of the Iberian Peninsula
Ancient peoples of Spain